Dark Horse Comics is an American comic book, graphic novel, and manga publisher founded in Milwaukie, Oregon by Mike Richardson in 1986. The company was created using funds earned from Richardson's chain of Portland, Oregon comic book shops known as Pegasus Books and founded in 1980.

Dark Horse Comics has emerged as the fourth largest comic publishing company in the United States of America. Dividing profits with artists and writers, as well as supporting artistic and creative rights in the comic book industry, Dark Horse Comics has become a strong proponent of publishing licensed material that often does not fit into mainstream media. Several titles include: Sin City, Hellboy, Buffy the Vampire Slayer, 300, and Star Wars.

In December 2021, Swedish gaming company Embracer Group launched its acquisition of Dark Horse Media, Dark Horse Comics' parent company, and completed the buyout in March 2022.

Overview 
Dark Horse has published many licensed comics, including comics based on Star Wars, Avatar: The Last Airbender, Buffy the Vampire Slayer, Aliens, Predator, and Terminator. Dark Horse Comics holds a notoriety for being the most reputable publisher in regard to allowing creators to retain ownership of their work. Founder Mike Richardson, created the company with creator rights in mind because of his frustration with the treatment of artists by comic publishers of the time. They have published several creator owned comics such as Frank Miller's Sin City and 300, Mike Mignola's Hellboy, Stan Sakai's Usagi Yojimbo, and Gerard Way's Umbrella Academy. With an emphasis on mini and limited series, Dark Horse Comics has given itself immense flexibility in the comic book publishing industry. This model allows the company to pull poorly performing series while also retaining the ability to reprint past works without intense scrutiny.

In 2006, The New York Times reported that "Dark Horse pays by the story or the page, and shares profit generated by comic books and related merchandise. That is different from the standard work-for-hire arrangement at DC and Marvel: creators are paid for a specific story and perhaps receive royalties from collected editions, but the bulk of the revenue, and all of the merchandising opportunities, remain with the companies".

History

Origins 
Mike Richardson was an active follower of the Amateur Press Association (APA), an organization focused on critiquing comics through conventions, fan projects, and newsletters. As a result of his involvement, Richardson became acquainted with Randy Stradley, an early Dark Horse Comics collaborator and editor. The two used their contacts from the APA to recruit artists and writers, many of whom were working for several top comic publishing groups.

1986–2006 
Dark Horse was founded in 1986 by Mike Richardson with Dark Horse Presents No. 1 and featured the first appearance of Paul Chadwick's Concrete and Chris Warner's Black Cross, selling approximately 50,000 copies, which was far better than predictions. The series has become a platform for new creators to highlight their works. The success of Dark Horse Comics can be attributed to a change in comic book marketing that occurred in the 1980s when comics began to be sold in comic specific stores. After his success, Richardson began buying the rights to several titles including: Godzilla in 1987, Aliens, Predator in 1989, and Star Wars in 1991 (owned by Marvel prior to the Dark Horse Comics acquisition). Dark Horse evolved further and began producing toys in 1991. Additionally, in 1992, Richardson formed Dark Horse Entertainment, the company's critically acclaimed film and television division.

With the release of the first Aliens comic in 1988 and Predator in 1988, Dark Horse Comics' popular characters appeared in their own line of work as well as Dark Horse Presents and Tarzan and numerous crossovers that included Superman and Batman of DC Comics, and WildC.A.T.s.

In a 1991 issue of Dark Horse Presents, Frank Miller introduced Sin City, one of Dark Horse Comics' most successful titles. In addition to this title, Miller introduced several other limited series set in dystopian societies including Give Me Liberty which ran from 1990-1991 and Hard Boiled.

The Mask, a mini series from Mark Badger, debuted in Dark Horse Presents 10-20 in 1991 and had a successful film adaptation, starring Jim Carrey, in 1994. However comic sales were not strengthened by the success of the film.

In 1993, Dark Horse established their own limited series superhero realm with the creation of Comics' Greatest World. However comic publishing changed in the 1990s and all Comics' Greatest World titles were canceled except for Ghost. As a result, Dark Horse Comics returned to their smaller scale business model.

Dark Horse Comics created the imprint Legends and as part of their focus on creators, the publisher began working with Mike Mignola. In 1994, Mignola's character Hellboy first appeared in Hellboy: Seed of Destruction the beginning of several limited and mini series with crossovers that included Batman of DC Comics.

1994 saw the release of the monthly manga mini series, Oh My Goddess!

The licensing to the unpopular limited series, Tarzan, was purchased by Dark Horse Comics in 1995 and ended in 1998.

Ghost, from Comics' Greatest World, began running as a solo title in 1995, but ended in 1998 and was subsequently launched once more the same year.

Eisner Award winning Usagi Yojimbo, written and drawn by third generation Japanese-American artist, Stan Sakai debuted in Dark Horse Comics in 1996 as a monthly issue and ran until 2019.

Dark Horse Comics began translating the manga series from Hiroaki Samura, Blade of the Immortal, in 1996 and ending in 2015.

For the first Free Comic Book Day on May 4, 2002, Dark Horse Comics published Star Wars: Tales - A Jedi’s Weapon and has participated in the event every year since.

2006–2021 
In 2006, Dark Horse was the third largest comics publisher. Per Diamond Comic Distributors, "Marvel had 36.9 percent of the market", DC "had 32.9 percent" and Dark Horse had "5.6 percent".

In 2007, Dark Horse donated copies of all of its published works to the Portland State University Library, which maintains both a browsing collection of book titles, in addition to a research collection which also includes every "print, poster, statue, figure, and all other products." As of July 15, 2016, the library has cataloged over 10,000 titles as "the official archive of Dark Horse publications."

In 2011, Dark Horse Presents relaunched including the return of Paul Chadwick's Concrete and Steve Niles' Criminal Macabre, as well as new talent including Sanford Greene, Carla Speed McNeil, Nate Crosby and others. Starting in 2013, Dark Horse began to reprint E. C. Archives, picking up the project of reprinting classic E. C. Comics from the 1950s where Gladstone left off, using the same size and format as Gladstone, with all stories reprinted in order and in full color.

In early 2017, Dark Horse Comic entered partnership with Crypton Future Media to publish official English-language Hatsune Miku-related manga. In late summer of 2018, a set of comic books for Mysticons were released. In 2018, Vanguard Visionary Associates, a Chinese media production company, became a partner of Dark Horse's subsidiary Dark Horse Entertainment along with a "major investment stake" in the subsidiary. Both Forbes and Publishers Weekly reported that "the investment stake is rumored to be about $20 million and will give Vanguard a majority interest in Dark House".

In 2020, Dark Horse announced it was severing ties with writer and editor Scott Allie "after a former Dark Horse employee accused him of sexual harassment and sexual assault across a period lasting more than a decade." It was reported that in 2015, "after reports of multiple instances of sexual misconduct" by Allie:Dark Horse Comics founder Mike Richardson released a statement to The Beat, which in part read, "In this particular case, action was taken immediately, though we did not, and cannot, perform a public flogging, as some might wish." Although Richardson said action had been taken, Allie continued as an editor for Dark Horse, transitioning from editor-in-chief to the role of executive senior editor in 2015, before departing Dark Horse as a full-time employee in 2017, continuing to work with them [until 2020] in a freelance capacity.

In June 2021, Dark Horse opened a video game and digital division, called Dark Horse Games. The division will be focused on development of AAA video games based on the company's IP.

In mid-November 2021, Dark Horse founder and CEO Mike Richardson announced that the company would be publishing a new line of all-ages Star Wars comics and graphic novels in collaboration with Lucasfilm and Disney Publishing Worldwide. Dark Horse had previously held the licensing rights for producing Star Wars comics between 1991 and 2015.

Acquisition by Embracer Group 
In December 2021, Bloomberg reported Dark Horse Comics for sale to a Hollywood studio. Companies rumored as potential buyers include Netflix, The Walt Disney Company, and ViacomCBS, but a representative couldn't comment. However, later in the month, Embracer Group (a video game holding company) announced that it launched its acquisition of Dark Horse Media, including Dark Horse Comics and Dark Horse Entertainment, and that the company would be the 10th operative division in the company.

Multiple news outlets highlighted that this deal gives Embracer Group access to Dark Horse's "300-plus pieces of intellectual property". This deal also grants Dark Horse access to additional intellectual property maintained by Embracer; "sources close to the publisher say that founder and CEO Mike Richardson maintains creative control over Dark Horse under the terms of the deal, while the company receives a level of financial stability it hasn't previously enjoyed as an independent entity, even as it separates from its deal with Chinese pop culture company Vanguard Visionary Associates". The Hollywood Reporter commented that for the Embracer Group this deal was "not just an opportunity to expand properties into comics, but other media. Dark Horse's ongoing relationship with media companies through current and future adaptations and the Dark Horse Entertainment subsidiary open up the potential for Embracer to push projects outside of the video game arena. Dark Horse isn't simply the fourth-largest comic book publisher in the U.S. industry, after all; it's also a company with a first-look deal with Netflix, as well as an ongoing relationship with Universal Content Productions".

Embracer finalized the acquisition of Dark Horse on March 14, 2022.

Distribution 
In June 2022, Dark Horse announced a business partnership with Penguin Random House Publishing as the company's new primary comic book distributor which was previously held by Diamond Comics Distributors for thirty years. On September 21, 2022, Dark Horse Comics announced the expansion of their business relationship with Penguin Random House. This multi-year distribution deal will begin in June 2023.

Dark Horse CEO Mike Richardson stated that the company decided to expand their business relationship with the legendary publishing company because they both wanted to improve comic book accessibility worldwide, and address fans concerns over high distribution fees with Diamond Comics, Inc.

Imprints and studios

Comics' Greatest World/Dark Horse Heroes (1993–1996)

From 1993 to 1996, Dark Horse published a line of superhero comics under the Comics' Greatest World imprint, which was later renamed Dark Horse Heroes. After 1996, publication of this line came to a near halt, ceasing production of any books concerning the characters with the publication of the last crossover books involving Ghost, in the early 2000s.

Legend (1994–1998)
Legend was a comic book imprint at Dark Horse Comics created in 1994 by Frank Miller and John Byrne as an avenue for creator-owned projects. Its logo was a moai drawn by Mike Mignola. Later on, other creators were asked to join them. The imprint ended in 1998.

Members
 Art Adams
 Frank Miller
 John Byrne
 Mike Mignola
 Paul Chadwick, Dave Gibbons, and Geof Darrow were also on the initial Dark Horse Legend launch tour.
 Mike Allred
 Walter Simonson

Dark Horse Manga
Dark Horse Manga is an imprint for Japanese manga translated into English. The company's first ongoing title was Oh My Goddess! by Kōsuke Fujishima, starting in August 1994. (Oh My Goddess! since became America's longest running manga series.) Other publications include Akira, Astro Boy, Berserk, Blade of the Immortal, Ghost in the Shell (manga), Lone Wolf and Cub, Trigun and Blood Blockade Battlefront by Yasuhiro Nightow, Gantz, Hellsing and Drifters by Kouta Hirano, Blood+, Multiple Personality Detective Psycho, FLCL, Mob Psycho 100, and Oreimo.

Dark Horse also publishes a number of titles by the all-female Japanese manga artist group CLAMP, including Clover, Chobits, Okimono Kimono, Cardcaptor Sakura, Magic Knight Rayearth, and Gate 7.

A manga magazine titled Super Manga Blast! was published by Dark Horse starting in the spring of 2000. It was discontinued in December 2005 after 59 issues.

Dark Horse also publishes a number of Korean manhwa titles, including Banya: The Explosive Delivery Man.

Maverick (1999–2002)

Maverick was an imprint for creator-owned material.

DH Press
The DH Press imprint publishes novelizations of Dark Horse's more popular comic book titles, including Aliens and Predator. DH Press has now been absorbed by DH Books.

M Press
Publications ranging from novels to film books by Leonard Maltin about John Landis, to comic related material such as a biography of Will Eisner, to health books. They have also published a series reprinting Playboy interviews. The M Press imprint was created to publish a diverse list of both literary fiction and non-fiction prose for authors with a unique voice. One such series is Orchid by Tom Morello, published from 2011 to 2013.  The newest addition to M Press is an original graphic novel The Fifth Beatle by Vivek Tiwary, Andrew Robinson, and Kyle Baker, published in November 2013.

Dark Horse Digital
In 2011, Dark Horse launched their iOS app and online digital comics store Dark Horse Digital, followed by the release of the beta version of a native Android app in 2012. Any device with a modern web browser can be used to read Dark Horse comics at their web store.

DH Deluxe
Initiated in 1998, Dark Horse Deluxe rolled out a line of merchandise that included model kits, toys, apparel, and collectibles. Its original purpose was to draw on Dark Horse properties but expanded to include such collectibles as Tim Burton's Tragic Toys for Girls and Boys, Joss Whedon's Serenity, and merchandise for the popular video-game franchise Mass Effect. Dark Horse, working with Big Tent Entertainment and the NHK broadcasting corporation, brought Domo-kun to the United States with a series of products ranging from Qee figurines to journals and stationery sets. David Scroggy was Vice President of Product Development at Dark Horse for many years, starting in that department in 1993 and retiring in 2017.

Kitchen Sink Books
In 2013, Denis Kitchen and John Lind co-founded Kitchen Sink Books with Dark Horse as a joint venture and independent imprint. The imprint name is in reference to Kitchen's former publishing company Kitchen Sink Press which ran from 1970 until 1999. Kitchen said of the venture, “John and I have packaged books for a number of first-rank publishers, but we have long discussed the ideal house to enjoy maximum freedom and creativity,” says Kitchen. “In longtime friend and publisher Mike Richardson and Dark Horse Comics, we found just that.” The imprint's output is infrequent, publishing 2-3 high-profile projects annually with editorial focus on art books and deluxe format collections. Creators published under the Kitchen Sink line include Will Eisner, Frank Miller, Harvey Kurtzman, Tony DiTerlizzi and collections/anthology titles include work from Jack Davis, Will Elder, Art Spiegelman, S. Clay Wilson, Monte Beauchamp, Bob Powell, Justin Green, Trina Robbins, Harvey Pekar, Arnold Roth, and Al Jaffee.

Berger Books
Former executive editor of Vertigo Karen Berger established the Berger Books imprint at Dark Horse in 2017. Titles published under the imprint include Hungry Ghosts written by Joel Rose and Anthony Bourdain, Incognegro (previously published through Vertigo) and a prequel Incognegro: Renaissance both written by Mat Johnson, The Seeds written by Ann Nocenti, She Could Fly written by Christopher Cantwell, and LaGuardia written by Nnedi Okorafor.

Dark Horse Games 
On June 2, 2021, Dark Horse Comics launched a Gaming and Digital Entertainment Division in partnership with AAA studios to bring many of its "older and lesser established IPs" into the gaming market.

Secret Stash Press 
In March 2022, it was announced that Dark Horse and filmmaker Kevin Smith would be teaming up to publish the books of Secret Stash Press, a new publishing line by Smith. The first two books of the line include Maskerade, written by Smith and Andy Mcelfresh and Quick Stops, written by Smith and set within the View Askewniverse.

Flux House 
In April 2022, it was announced that Matt Kindt was launching his Flux House imprint through Dark Horse, starting with MIND MGMT: Bootleg and continuing with Hairball in April 2023.

Dogu Publishing 
Stan Sakai moved his Usagi Yojimbo series to Dark Horse under his Dogu Publishing imprint in July 2022.

Albatross Funnybooks 
It was announced in September 2022 that Eric Powell had brought his Albatross Funnybooks imprint to Dark Horse. This would include series such as The Goon, Hillbilly and Big Man Plans, as well as Brendon Small’s Galaktikon and Rebecca Sugar’s Pug Davis.

Tiny Onion Studios 
In November 2022, it was announced that Dark Horse had partnered with James Tynion IV to release books of his Tiny Onion Studios. This will include original books and print versions of books previously available on Substack. The first of these books include Blue Book, written by Tynion and illustrated by Michael Avon Oeming, which will release in February 2023, while The Oddly Pedestrian Life of Christopher Chaos will release June 2023, with Tynion creating the story, Tate Brombal writing, and art by Isaac Goodhart.

Titles

Dark Horse Comics has acquired the rights to make comic book adaptations of many popular films and series. Some of these include Aliens, Army of Darkness (before Dynamite Entertainment acquired the license), Indiana Jones, Predator, RoboCop, The Thing, Star Wars, The Terminator, Buffy the Vampire Slayer (and its spin-off, Angel), Planet of the Apes, Let Me In and Avatar: The Last Airbender.

In 2013 CCP Games announced that Dark Horse would be publishing a series of comic books based on stories collected from players of the MMORPG EVE Online.

In 2014, Lucasfilm announced that, as of 2015, future Star Wars comics would be published by Lucasfilm's corporate sibling, Marvel Comics. In 2017, Dark Horse Comics began publishing Critical Role: Vox Machina Origins based on the web series Critical Role. In 2019, Critical Role: Vox Machina Origins was Dark Horse's 6th best selling title with 19,000 copies sold.

Dark Horse Entertainment

Dark Horse's production studio arm, Dark Horse Entertainment, produces films and television shows based on Dark Horse Comics. Established by Richardson in 1992, Dark Horse Entertainment set up shop on the lot at Twentieth Century Fox through a first-look deal with Larry Gordon and Largo Entertainment. Dark Horse Entertainment has produced over two dozen films and television projects.

Dark Horse Entertainment's 2018 deal with Vanguard Visionary Associates was "intended to allow the company to fully finance development of properties already owned by the company, as well as acquire outside material for media adaptation. Additionally, the partnership is intended to be a gateway for Dark Horse to bring its comic book library to new foreign markets, with a particular focus on China". In 2019, Dark Horse Entertainment set up a first-look deal with the streaming company Netflix.
In August 2022, Netflix and Dark Horse renewed their first look deal for film and TV.

Television
The following are TV projects based on Dark Horse comic books:
Duckman (1994–1997, animated series)
The Mask (1995–1997, animated series)
Timecop (1997–1998)
Fat Dog Mendoza (2000–2001, animated series)
Big Guy and Rusty the Boy Robot (1999–2001, animated series)
The B.P.R.D. Declassified (2004, special)
The Amazing Screw-On Head (2006, animated pilot)
Axe Cop (2013–2015, animated series)
Dark Matter (2015–2017)
The Umbrella Academy (2019–present)
The Rocketeer (2019–2020, animated series)
Resident Alien (2021–present)
Samurai Rabbit: The Usagi Chronicles (2022–present, animated series)
Fear Agent (TBA)
Grendel (TBA)
Hungry Ghosts (TBA, animated series)
Iyanu: Child of Wonder (TBA, animated series)
Mind MGMT (TBA)
She Could Fly (TBA)
Sin City (TBA)
 Wyrd (TBA)

Television shows with graphic novels
Avatar: The Last Airbender (2012–present)
The Legend of Korra (2017–present)
Mysticons (2018–2020)
Trollhunters (2018)

Films
The following are feature films based on series from Dark Horse Comics:

Released projects
 Dr. Giggles (1992)
 The Mask (1994)
 Timecop (1994)
 Tank Girl (1995)
 Enemy (1996)
 Barb Wire (1996)
 Mystery Men (1999)
 Virus (1999)
 G-Men from Hell (2000)
 American Splendor (2003)
 Timecop 2: The Berlin Decision (2003, direct-to-video)
 Alien vs. Predator (2004)
 Hellboy (2004)
 Sin City (2005)
 Son of the Mask (2005)
 Hellboy: Sword of Storms (2006, animated, television)
 300 (2007)
 Hellboy: Blood and Iron (2007, animated, television)
 Aliens vs. Predator: Requiem (2007)
 Hellboy II: The Golden Army (2008)
 R.I.P.D. (2013)
 Sin City: A Dame to Kill For (2014)
 300: Rise of an Empire (2014)
 Polar (2019)
 Hellboy (2019)
 Chickenhare and the Hamster of Darkness (2022, animated)
 R.I.P.D. 2: Rise of the Damned (2022, direct-to-video)
 Bang! (TBA)
 Dept. H (TBA)
 Hellboy: The Crooked Man (TBA)
 Lady Killer (TBA)
 Mystery Girl (TBA)
 Tank Girl reboot (TBA)
 The Goon (TBA, animated)

Cancelled projects

References

Further reading

External links

Interviews

 
 
 
 
 
 

American subsidiaries of foreign companies
Dark Horse Comics
Embracer Group
2022 mergers and acquisitions
Comic book publishing companies of the United States
Manga distributors
Manhwa distributors
Companies based in Milwaukie, Oregon
American companies established in 1986
Publishing companies established in 1986
Webcomic publishing companies
Book publishing companies based in Oregon
1986 establishments in Oregon
Publishers of adult comics
Disney comics publishers